The holiest sites in Islam are predominantly located in the Arabian Peninsula and the Levant. While the significance of most places typically varies depending on the Islamic sect, there is a consensus across all mainstream branches of the religion that affirms three cities as having the highest degree of holiness, in descending order: Mecca, Medina, and Jerusalem. Mecca's Al-Masjid al-Haram (including the Kaaba), Al-Masjid an-Nabawi in Medina, and Al-Masjid al-Aqsa, or the Temple Mount, in Jerusalem are all revered by Muslims as sites of great importance. 

Both the Umayyad Mosque in the city of Damascus and the Ibrahimi Mosque in the city of Hebron have held interchangeable significance as the fourth-holiest Islamic sites.  

After the consensus on the first four sites as well as further sites associated with the family of Muhammad, there is a divergence between Sunni Muslims and Shia Muslims on the designation of additional holy sites. For Sunnis, sites associated with the companions of Muhammad, the Rashidun, and Biblical prophets hold a high level of significance (see holiest sites in Sunni Islam). For Shias, sites associated with the Imamah hold a high level of significance (see holiest sites in Shia Islam). As part of the Hajj, the majority of Muslims also visit the sites of Mina, Mount Arafat, and Muzdalifah in addition to the Kaaba.

Hejaz

Hejaz is the region in the Arabian Peninsula where Mecca and Medina are located. It is thus where the Islamic prophet Muhammad was born and raised.

The two holy cities of Islam, Mecca and Medina, are traditionally known as the Ḥaramayn, which is the dual form of ḥaram, thus meaning "The Two Sanctuaries". They should not be confused with Jerusalem and Hebron, which were also called Haramain during the Mamluk period. Another appellation of the Two Noble Sanctuaries is Ḥaramayn Ṭayyibayn.

Mecca

Mecca is considered the holiest city in Islam, as it is home to Islam's holiest site Kaaba ('Cube') in Al-Masjid Al-Ḥaram (The Sacred Mosque).  Only Muslims are allowed to enter this place.

The area of Mecca, which includes Mount Arafah, Mina and Muzdalifah, is important for the Ḥajj ('Pilgrimage'). As one of the Five Pillars of Islam, every adult Muslim who is capable must perform the Hajj at least once in their lifetime. Hajj is one of the largest annual Muslim gatherings in the world, second only to pilgrimages to the mosques of Husayn ibn Ali and his half-brother Abbas in Karbala, Iraq, with attendance reaching three million in 2012.

Medina

Al-Masjid an-Nabawi is located in Medina, making the city the second-holiest site in Islam, after Mecca. Medina is the final place-of-residence of Muhammad, and where his qabr (grave) is located. In addition to the Prophet's Mosque, the city has the mosques of Qubāʾ and Al-Qiblatayn ("The Two Qiblahs").

Levant 

Ash-Shaam or the Levant is a historical region that includes the cities of Jerusalem and Damascus.

Jerusalem 

The Al-Aqsa Mosque compound (Masjid Al-Aqsa) in Jerusalem is the third holiest site in Islam. The compound is held in esteem by the entire Muslim community, due to its history as a place of worship by many prophets such as Ibrahim (Abraham), Dawud (David), Sulaiman (Solomon), Ilyas (Elijah) and Isa (Jesus). The mosque has the capacity to accommodate in the region of 400,000 worshippers. According to Islamic tradition, the Temple Mount served as the first qiblah (direction of prayer) for Muhammad and his Ummah, before the Kaaba in Mecca. Muslims believe that Muhammad was taken from Masjid Al-Haram in Mecca, to visit Masjid al-Aqsa, where he led the prayer among the prophets, and was then taken to the heavens from the Foundation Stone (today part of the Dome of the Rock) in a single night in the year 620. References to the Al-Aqsa Mosque exist in the following verses of the Qur'an: 
 Verse 12 of Chapter no. 5 (Surah Al-Ma'idah),
 Verse 1 of Chapter no. 17 (Surah Al-Isra'),
 Verse 51 of Chapter no. 21 (Surah Al-Anbiya), and
 Verse 10 of Chapter no. 34 (Surah Saba').

Damascus 

The Umayyad Mosque in Damascus is often considered the fourth holiest site in Islam. The head of John the Baptist, revered in Islam as the prophet Yahya, is believed to be in a shrine inside the mosque, which also houses one of only four authorized original copies of the Quran. The Umayyad Mosque is also the place where Muslims believe the prophet Jesus (Isa, in Arabic) will return at the end of times, atop the "Minaret of Isa" of the mosque, during the time of a Fajr prayer. It is believed that prayers in the Umayyad mosque are considered to be equal to those offered in Jerusalem. 

The mosque also holds special importance to Shia Muslims since it contains shrines commemorating Husayn ibn Ali and the Ahl al-Bayt, made to walk there from Iraq, after the Battle of Karbala. Furthermore, it was the place where they were imprisoned for 60 days.

Hebron 

In Islamic belief, Hebron was where the prophet Ibrahim or Abraham settled. Within the city lies the Sanctuary of Abraham, the traditional burial site of the biblical Patriarchs and Matriarchs, and the Ibrahimi Mosque, built on top of the tomb to honor the prophet, is also often considered to be the fourth holiest in Islam. Muslims believe that Muhammad visited Hebron on his nocturnal journey from Mecca to Jerusalem to stop by the tomb and pay his respects. In the mosque in a small niche there is a left footprint, believed to be from Muhammad.

Sinai Peninsula 

The Sinai Peninsula is associated with the prophets Harun (Aaron) and Musa (Moses). In particular, numerous references to Mount Sinai exist in the Quran, where it is called Ṭūr Saināʾ, Ṭūr Sīnīn, and aṭ-Ṭūr and al-Jabal (both meaning "the Mount"). As for the adjacent Wād Ṭuwā (Valley of Tuwa), it is considered as being muqaddas (sacred), and a part of it is called Al-Buqʿah Al-Mubārakah ("The Blessed Place").

Sunni Islam 

In Sunni Islam, all sites which have been mentioned in the Hadith are holy to Sunni Muslims. The Kaaba is the holiest site, followed by the Al-Masjid an-Nabawi (The Prophet's Mosque), Al Aqsa Mosque compound, and other sites mentioned in the Hadith, as well Umayyad Mosque, Ibrahimi Mosque.

Kaaba 
The Kaaba or Masjid al-Haram in Mecca, is the most sacred holy place of Islam and a Qibla of the Muslims, contains al-Bayt ul-Ma'mur spiritually above the Kaaba, contains the Maqam Ibrahim, Hateem, and the Al-Hajar-ul-Aswad which belonged in Jannah to Adam and Eve (Adam and Hawa). According to the Islamic tradition it was first built by the first prophet Adam, after Noah's Flood the flood of the prophet Nūḥ (Noah), it was then rebuilt by Abraham (ʾIbrāhīm) and his son Ishmael (Ismāʿīl), it has been rebuilt several times.

Al-Masjid an-Nabawi 
The Al-Masjid an-Nabawi or the Prophet's Mosque in Medina, contains the grave of Muhammad. The two companions Abu Bakr and Umar are also buried with Muhammad, the grave of Uthman in located in Al-Baqi' cemetery located to the southeast of the Prophet's Mosque, while the grave of Ali and is in Kufa. The grave of Al-Hasan is also in Al-Baqi', while Al-Husayn is buried in Kufa.

Al-Masjid al-Aqsa 
Jerusalem's Temple Mount, called Al-Masjid al-Aqṣā in the Quran, was the first qibla of the Muslims before the Kaaba. According to tradition, Muhammad on the occasion of Isra' and Mi'raj led all the prophets and angels at the site, the site of the "mosque" built by Solomon (or Sulaymān), son of David (or Dāwūd) and king of the Israelites.

Others 
 The Damascus Mosque is also considered the sacred mosque for the Muslims, and it is believed that Jesus (ʿĪsā ibn Maryam) will return in this mosque.
 The Ibrahimi Mosque in Palestine, contains the burial of Ibrahim and a few members of his family.
 The city Bukhara in Uzbekistan (which is associated with Imam Al-Bukhari) is considered as a holy city.

Shia Islam 

After the four mosques accepted by all Muslims as holy sites, the Shi'ah consider Imam Ali Masjid in Najaf as the holiest site of only Shia Muslims, followed by Imam Husayn Shrine in Karbala.

Imam Ali Mosque 

Imam Ali Mosque in Najaf, Iraq is the holiest site for Shia Muslims as the first Shia Imam Ali was buried here. The site is visited annually by at least 8 million pilgrims on average, which is estimated to increase to 20 million in years to come.

Imam Husayn Shrine 

Imam Husayn Shrine in Karbala, Iraq is the second most holiest site for Shia Muslims. It contains the tomb of Husayn ibn Ali. The mosque stands on the site of the grave of Hussein ibn Ali, where he was martyred during the Battle of Karbala in 680. Up to a million pilgrims visit the city for the anniversary of Hussein ibn Ali's death. There are many Shia traditions which narrate the status of Karbala.

Fatima Masumeh Shrine 

The city of Qom in Iran contains the tomb of Fātimah bint Mūsā, sister of the eighth Twelver Shi'ite Imam, Ali al-Rida. The tomb has been considered to be the third holiest shrine in Twelver Shia Islam. The shrine has attracted to itself dozens of seminaries and religious schools.

Sufi Islam

Mazar Ghous 

Mazar Ghous in Baghdad, Iraq is the holiest site in Sufi Islam. It is dedicated to the founder of Qadiryya Sufi order, Abdul Qadir Gilani. The complex was built near the Bab al-Sheikh (ash-Sheikh Gate) in al-Rusafa.

Tomb of Shah Rukn-e-Alam 

The Tomb of Shah Rukn-e-Alam in Multan is considered the third most holiest site in Sufi Islam. It is the mausoleum of Multan's Sufi saint Sheikh Rukn-ud-Din Abul Fateh. It is one of the most impressive shrines in the world. The shrine attracts over 100,000 pilgrims to the annual Urs festival that commemorates his death.

See also 

 Ḥ-R-M
 Haram (site)
 Lists of mosques
 List of largest mosques
 List of mosques
 Middle East
 Near East

References

Bibliography

External links 
 Jerusalem in the Qur'an
 Al Quds fil Quran (in Arabic Language)
 Charting the holy cities of Islam – the world’s most evasive list

sites